Anolis doris, the Gonave stout anole, is a species of lizard in the family Dactyloidae. The species is endemic to  Gonâve Island in Haiti.

References

Anoles
Lizards of the Caribbean
Reptiles of Haiti
Endemic fauna of Haiti
Reptiles described in 1925
Taxa named by Thomas Barbour